The 2002–03 Atlantic 10 Conference men's basketball season marked the 27th season of Atlantic 10 Conference basketball.

Atlantic 10 Preseason Poll 

First-place votes in parentheses

Preseason All-A10 Team 
First Team

Second Team

Third Team

Regular season

Postseason

Atlantic 10 Tournament

All the games were held at University of Dayton Arena in Dayton, Ohio.

Conference awards & honors

Rankings

Post Tournament Results

NCAA tournament
 Dayton Wildcats (0-1): Eliminated by Tulsa in the first round
 Xavier Musketeers (1-1): Eliminated by Maryland in the second round
 Saint Joseph's Hawks (0-1): Eliminated by Auburn in the first round

National Invitation Tournament
 Rhode Island Rams (1-1): Eliminated by Temple in the second round
 Richmond Spiders (0-1): Eliminated by Providence in the opening round
 Temple Owls (3-1): Eliminated by Minnesota in the quarterfinals

References

External links
"Men's Basketball - Archives 2002-03", Atlantic 10 Conference. Retrieved on 9 November 2017.
2002–03 Atlantic 10 Conference season summary, sports-reference.com. Retrieved on 9 November 2017.